Meall a' Bhùiridh (IPA:[ˈmauɫ̪ˈaˈvuːɾʲɪʝ]) is a mountain on the edge of Rannoch Moor in the Highlands of Scotland. It lies near the top of Glen Coe and Glen Etive, overlooking the Kings House Hotel inn and the A82 road. The Glencoe Ski area is located on the northern slopes of the peak.

Meall a' Bhùiridh is linked by a high bealach to the neighbouring peak of Creise, and the two hills are often climbed in conjunction, starting and finishing at the ski area carpark.

The Clachlet Traverse is a 25 km north-to-south route linking the inn at Inveroran with the Kingshouse. Meall a' Bhùiridh is the final of four Munros crossed on this route, the others being (south to north) Stob a' Choire Odhair, Stob Ghabhar and Creise.

See also 
 Ben Nevis
 List of Munro mountains
 Mountains and hills of Scotland

References

External links
 Glencoe Mountain
 Glencoe Ski area
 Highland-Instinct

Munros
Marilyns of Scotland
Mountains and hills of the Central Highlands
Ski areas and resorts in Scotland
Mountains and hills of Highland (council area)
One-thousanders of Scotland
Glen Coe